Ali Zohari was an Iranian politician.

A protégé of Mozzafar Baghai, he was elected to the parliament in 1952 election as a senior Toilers Party of the Iranian Nation member supported by the National Front. He soon broke away from the National Front along with his fellow party members. On 6 July 1953, he moved to initiate the motion of censure for government of Mossadegh.

References 

National Front (Iran) MPs
Toilers Party of the Iranian Nation politicians
Deputies of Tehran, Rey, Shemiranat and Eslamshahr
Iranian politicians who have crossed the floor
Members of the 17th Iranian Majlis
Year of birth missing